This article shows all participating team squads at the 2003 FIVB Women's World Cup, held from November 1 to November 15, 2003 in several cities in Japan.

Head Coach: Hugo Jáuregui

Head Coach: José Roberto Guimarães

Head Coach: Chen Zhonghe

Head Coach: Luis Felipe Calderón

Head Coach: Jorge Garbey

Head Coach: Hesham Badrawey

Head Coach: Marco Bonitta

Head Coach: Shoichi Yanagimoto

Head Coach: Ryszard Niemczyk

Head Coach: Kim Cheol-yong

Head Coach: Reşat Yazıcıoğulları

Head Coach: Toshi Yoshida

References
FIVB website

F
S